Carlos Enrique Cuartas Bedoya (15 August 1940–10 July 2011) was a Colombian chess International Master.

He was Colombian Champion seven times between 1965 and 1983.

Cuartas played ten times for Colombia in the Chess Olympiads.

References

External links

1940 births
2011 deaths
Chess International Masters
Colombian chess players
Chess Olympiad competitors
20th-century Colombian people
21st-century Colombian people